The Yıldız class is series of two fast attack craft/missile boats of the Turkish Navy. They class was designed by Lürssen Werft of Germany and share the same hull layout as the preceding . Both ships of the class were built in Turkey and entered service in 1996. They remain in service.

Description
The Yıldız class are missile-carrying fast attack craft (FAC) designed by Lürssen Werft of Germany. They share the same hull design as the preceding  (Lürssen Werft PB 57 design), with a steel hull and aluminum superstructure.

The Yıldız class have a complement of 45 including 6 officers.

The Yıldız class are equipped with Siemens/Plessey AW 6 Dolphin air & surface search radar,  Oerlikon Contraves TMX-CW fire control radar and a LIOD Mk.2 optronic director. For countermeasures the FAC mount two Mark 36 SRBOC chaff launchers and Racal Cutlass Tacticos combat data system.

The vessels are also equipped with a OTO Melara  dual-purpose gun mounted forward with a range of  against surface targets and  against air targets. The Yıldız class also has a dual Oerlikon  anti-aircraft (AA) gun mount located aft with a range of  against air targets.

Vessels in class

Construction and career
Two FAC were ordered in June 1991 from Taşkisak Yard in Istanbul, Turkey. The second ship, Karayel, was launched on 20 June 1995. Yıldız was the first to enter service on 3 June 1996, followed by Karayel on 19 September later that year. Both vessels remain in service. The following  are an improved version of the Yıldız class.

See also
  - another class based on the PB 57 design
 List of Turkish Navy ships

Citations

Sources

External links
 Turkish Navy Yıldız class patrol craft

Missile boat classes
Missile boats of the Turkish Navy